Arthur Gerald Carney (September 23, 1900 – March 24, 1962) was a professional American football player who played offensive lineman for two seasons for the New York Giants.

References

1900 births
1962 deaths
American football offensive guards
Navy Midshipmen football players
New York Giants players
Players of American football from New York City